Colette Appel (born July 22, 1986) is an American former pair skater. With Lee Harris, she is the 2002 U.S. national junior champion and placed 12th at the 2002 World Junior Championships. They were fourth at two ISU Junior Grand Prix events and on the senior level at the 2003 Finlandia Trophy.

Earlier in her career, Appel competed with Adam Kaplan. They were the 1998 U.S. pairs champions on the Intermediate level and the 1999 U.S. silver medalists on the novice level. From 2011 to 2013, Appel was an athlete member of the U.S. Figure Skating Pairs Committee. She received her Bachelor degrees in Psychology and also in Liberal Studies: Teaching and Learning from California State University Channel Islands.

Programs 

With Harris

Results

With Harris

With Kaplan

References

External links
 
 Colette Appel / Lee Harris at Tracings.net

American female pair skaters
1986 births
Living people
Sportspeople from Hartford, Connecticut
21st-century American women
20th-century American women